The 2013 Korea Open was a women's professional tennis tournament played on hard courts. It was the 10th edition of the tournament, which was part of the 2013 WTA Tour. It took place in Seoul, South Korea between 16 and 22 September 2013.

Singles main-draw entrants

Seeds 

 1 Rankings are as of September 9, 2013

Other entrants 

The following players received wildcards into the singles main draw:
  Han Sung-hee 
  Jang Su-jeong
  Lee Ye-ra

The following players received entry from the qualifying draw:
  Chan Chin-wei 
  Han Xinyun 
  Ons Jabeur 
  Risa Ozaki

Withdrawals
Before the tournament
  Kiki Bertens (ankle injury)
  Caroline Garcia
  Jamie Hampton (left ankle injury)
  Ekaterina Makarova
  Ayumi Morita
  Magdaléna Rybáriková
  Carla Suárez Navarro
  Stefanie Vögele

Doubles main-draw entrants

Seeds 

1 Rankings are as of September 9, 2013

Other entrants 

The following pairs received wildcards into the doubles main draw:
  Hong Seung-yeon /  Lee Hye-min
  Han Sung-hee /  Lee So-ra

Finals

Singles 

 Agnieszka Radwańska defeated  Anastasia Pavlyuchenkova 6–7(6–8), 6–3, 6–4

Doubles 

 Chan Chin-wei /  Xu Yifan defeated  Raquel Kops-Jones /  Abigail Spears 7–5, 6–3

References 
Singles, Doubles, and Qualifying Singles Draws

External links 

Official website

Korea Open
Korea Open (tennis)
Korea Open
September 2013 sports events in South Korea
2013 in South Korean women's sport